Ethel Larcombe defeated Charlotte Sterry 6–3, 6–1 in the all comers' final to win the ladies' singles tennis title at the 1912 Wimbledon Championships. The reigning champion Dorothea Lambert Chambers did not defend her title.

Draw

All comers' finals

Top half

Section 1

Section 2

Bottom half

Section 3

Section 4

The nationality of Miss Schultz is unknown.

References

External links

Women's Singles
Wimbledon Championship by year – Women's singles
Wimbledon Championships - Singles
Wimbledon Championships - Singles